CNCO are a Latin American boy band.

CNCO may also refer to:

 CNCO (album), their 2018 studio album
 China Navigation Company (CNCo), a merchant shipping company